Cleugh may refer to:

Eric Arthur Cleugh, British diplomat
Helen Cleugh, atmospheric scientist
James Cleugh, English author and translator
M.F. Cleugh, British philosopher and educationalist 
Cleugh Passage, a strait in the Andaman Islands

See also
Battle of Pinkie Cleugh, in Scotland
Clough (disambiguation)